Italy participated in the Eurovision Song Contest 2018. Italian broadcaster RAI announced in October 2017 that the winning performer(s) of the Big Artists section of the Sanremo Music Festival 2018 would earn the right to represent the nation at the Eurovision Song Contest in Lisbon, Portugal.

Background 

Prior to the 2018 contest, Italy had participated in the Eurovision Song Contest forty-three times since its first entry during the inaugural contest in 1956. Since then, Italy has won the contest on two occasions: in 1964 with the song "Non ho l'età" performed by Gigliola Cinquetti and in 1990 with the song "Insieme: 1992" performed by Toto Cutugno. Italy has withdrawn from the Eurovision Song Contest a number of times with their most recent absence spanning from 1998 until 2010. Their return in 2011 with the song "Madness of Love", performed by Raphael Gualazzi, placed second—their highest result, to this point, since their victory in 1990. In 2017, Francesco Gabbani represented the nation with the song "Occidentali's Karma", placing sixth with 334 points.

The Italian national broadcaster, Radiotelevisione italiana (RAI), broadcasts the event within Italy and organises the selection process for the nation's entry. RAI confirmed Italy's participation in the 2018 Eurovision Song Contest on 15 September 2017. Between 2011 and 2013, the broadcaster used the Sanremo Music Festival as an artist selection pool where a special committee would select one of the competing artist, independent of the results in the competition, as the Eurovision entrant. The selected entrant was then responsible for selecting the song they would compete with. For 2014, RAI forwent using the Sanremo Music Festival artist lineup and internally selected their entry. Since 2015, the winning artist of the Sanremo Music Festival is rewarded with the opportunity to represent Italy at the Eurovision Song Contest, although in 2016 the winner declined and the broadcaster appointed the runner-up as the Italian entrant.

Before Eurovision

Sanremo 2018
On 12 October 2017, Italian broadcaster RAI confirmed that the performer that would represent Italy at the 2018 Eurovision Song Contest would be selected from the competing artists at the Sanremo Music Festival 2018. According to the rules of Sanremo 2018, the winner of the Campioni or Big Artists category earns the right to represent Italy at the Eurovision Song Contest, but in case the artist is not available or refuses the offer, the organisers of the event reserve the right to choose another participant via their own criteria. The competition took place between 6–10 February 2018 with the winner being selected on the last day of the festival.

Twenty artists competed in the Big Artists category of Sanremo 2017. Among the competing artists were former Eurovision Song Contest entrants who all represented Italy. Riccardo Fogli in 1983, Luca Barbarossa in 1988, Enrico Ruggeri, frontman of Decibel in 1993, and Nina Zilli in 2012. The performers in the "Big Artists" category were:

Final
During the final evening of the Sanremo Music Festival 2018, Ermal Meta and Fabrizio Moro were selected as the winners with the song "Non mi avete fatto niente". RAI later confirmed during the closing press conference for the Sanremo Music Festival on 10 February 2018 that Meta and Moro had accepted to participate at Eurovision and would perform their Sanremo song "Non mi avete fatto niente" at the Eurovision Song Contest 2018.

At Eurovision 
The Eurovision Song Contest 2018 took place at the Altice Arena in Lisbon, Portugal and consisted of two semi-finals on 8 and 10 May and the final on 12 May 2018. According to Eurovision rules, all nations with the exceptions of the host country and the "Big Five" (France, Germany, Italy, Spain and the United Kingdom) are required to qualify from one of two semi-finals in order to compete for the final; the top ten countries from each semi-final progress to the final. As a member of the "Big Five", Italy automatically qualified to compete in the final. In addition to their participation in the final, Italy was also required to broadcast and vote in one of the two semi-finals.

Voting

Points awarded to Italy

Points awarded by Italy

Detailed voting results
The following members comprised the Italian jury:
 Silvia Gavarotti (jury chairperson)singer
 Antonella Nesijournalist
 Sandro Cominiconductor
 Matteo Catalanoauthor
 Barbara Mosconijournalist

Notes and references

Notes

References

External links
 RAI's official Eurovision website

2018
Countries in the Eurovision Song Contest 2018
Eurovision
Eurovision